Joseph Jesse Dave Bélanger (born June 15, 1969) is a Canadian former professional ice hockey centre who played in the National Hockey League from 1991 to 2001.

Playing career
As a youth, he played in the 1981 and 1982 Quebec International Pee-Wee Hockey Tournaments with a minor ice hockey team from Saint-Georges, Quebec.

Despite an excellent junior career with the Granby Bisons during which he twice topped 100 points, Bélanger was never selected in the NHL Entry Draft. He signed as a free agent with the Montreal Canadiens in 1990, and immediately showed his talent, scoring 98 points for the Fredericton Canadiens of the American Hockey League.

Bélanger spent three seasons in the Montreal organization, but struggled to crack a deep, talented team full-time. He was recalled for 4 games in 1991–92, and received a 19-game stint in the NHL in 1992–93, during which he scored his first 4 NHL goals and added 2 assists for 6 points. He was on the team's roster for the 1993 playoffs and appeared in 9 games, helping Montreal win their 24th Stanley Cup.

Bélanger received his big break the next summer when he was exposed in the 1993 NHL Expansion Draft and claimed by the Florida Panthers. In Florida he received a chance to play regularly, and responded in fine fashion in 1993–94, posting 17 goals and a team-leading 33 assists for 50 points. He would follow up with another strong season in the lockout-shortened 1994–95 campaign, leading the Panthers with 15 goals and 29 points in 47 games.

In 1995–96, Bélanger was again amongst the Panthers' leading scorers when he was dealt to the Vancouver Canucks at the trade deadline. He finished the season with 42 points including a career-high 20 goals, but struggled in Vancouver and was a healthy scratch in the playoffs.

Released by Vancouver, Bélanger signed with the Edmonton Oilers for the 1996–97 season, but he failed to crack their roster and appeared in only 6 games as an Oiler. This began a five-year stretch where he spent most of his time in the minors and bounced from organization to organization, seeing only brief stints of NHL action. The highlight of this period was a return to Montreal in 1999–2000, during which he played well and recorded 3 goals and 9 points in 16 games. A pointless 12-game stint with the New York Islanders in 2000–01 would effectively mark the end of his NHL career.

Bélanger spent the final four seasons of his career in Europe playing in Germany and Switzerland . In 2003–2004, he finished 2nd in scoring in the German DEL, and helped the Frankfurt Lions to the league championship. In 2004–2005 and 2005–2006 he was the top scorer of the  EHC Biel before going to play for the Lausanne hockey club.

In 246 NHL games, Bélanger recorded 59 goals and 76 assists for 135 points, along with 56 penalty minutes. He ended his playing career after 6 seasons in the LNAH with Saint-Georges on August 9, 2013.

Career statistics

References

External links

1969 births
EHC Biel players
Canadian ice hockey centres
Chicago Wolves (IHL) players
Cleveland Lumberjacks players
Edmonton Oilers players
Florida Panthers players
Frankfurt Lions players
Fredericton Canadiens players
Granby Bisons players
Hamburg Freezers players
Hamilton Bulldogs (AHL) players
HC La Chaux-de-Fonds players
Las Vegas Thunder players
Lausanne HC players
Living people
Montreal Canadiens players
New York Islanders players
People from Saint-Georges, Quebec
Quebec Citadelles players
Quebec Rafales players
Saint-Georges Cool FM 103.5 players
SC Herisau players
Stanley Cup champions
Undrafted National Hockey League players
Vancouver Canucks players
Canadian expatriate ice hockey players in Germany
Canadian expatriate ice hockey players in Switzerland